Francisco Avellaneda (Spanish: Francesco de Abillaneda) (died 3 October 1591) was a Roman Catholic prelate who served as Archbishop of Acerenza e Matera (1591).

Biography
Francisco Avellaneda  was born in Spain.
On 30 January 1591, Francisco Avellaneda was appointed during the papacy of Pope Gregory XIV as Archbishop of Acerenza e Matera.
He served as Archbishop of Acerenza e Matera until his death on 3 October 1591.

See also 
Catholic Church in Italy

References

External links and additional sources
 (for Chronology of Bishops) 
 (for Chronology of Bishops 

16th-century Italian Roman Catholic archbishops
Bishops appointed by Pope Gregory XIV
1591 deaths